Julie Lohre (born September 12, 1974 Julie Trauth) is a professional fitness competitor from the United States. She is well known in the fitness industry for her intense and entertaining gymnastic routines.  She is one of the fitness industry pioneers of online personal training.  She is recognized as one of the top 50 online personal trainers in the world.  She has achieved a high level of success in the IFBB and includes top 5 finishes in the top competitions in the sport of fitness, including the Fitness Olympia and Arnold Classic.  She has also competed in the Crossfit Games, appeared on NBC's American Ninja Warrior, was a leading candidate for NBC's Biggest Loser Trainer spot and is featured regularly in magazines such as Muscle & Fitness, Esquire, Oxygen, FLEX, GORGO Women's Fitness and other health industry magazines.

Vital Stats 
 Full name: Julie Michelle Lohre 
 Birthday: September 12 
 Place of Birth: Cincinnati, Ohio
 Current residence: Kentucky
 Occupation: Online Personal Trainer, Writer, Fitness Model 
 Height: 5' 5" 
 Weight: 130 
 Eye Color: Green 
 Hair Color: Blonde 
 Ethnicity: Caucasian

Career & Contest history
IFBB Competitions
 2008 IFBB Fitness Olympia
2008 IFBB Fitness International – 4th
2007 IFBB Fitness – Palm Beach Pro – 2nd
2007 IFBB Fitness Olympia – 8th
2007 IFBB Fitness – Atlantic City Pro – 3rd
2007 IFBB All Star Fitness 2nd
2007 IFBB Europa Super Show 4th
2006 IFBB Fitness – Palm Beach Pro – 3rd
2006 IFBB Fitness – Atlantic City Pro – 4th 
2006 IFBB Fitness – Europa Super Show 7th
2006 IFBB Fitness – All Star Fitness 5th
2006 IFBB Figure – Pittsburgh Pro 12th
2006 IFBB Figure – San Francisco Pro 8th
2005 IFBB Figure – Charlotte Pro 10th
2005 IFBB Figure – Europa Super Show 4th

Amateur and NPC Competitions
2004 NPC Nationals Fitness 2nd – Earned IFBB Pro Card – Best Routine of Show – Special Award
2004 NPC USA's Fitness 6th
2004 NPC Pittsburgh Fitness 1st and Overall
2004 NPC Pittsburgh Figure 5th
2004 NPC Cincinnati Figure 1st and Overall
2003 NPC Natural Northern USA's Figure 1st
2003 NPC Indianapolis Figure 1st
2003 NPC Cincinnati Figure 2nd
2003 NPC Northern Kentucky Figure 1st and Overall
2004 WWE Diva Search Semi-Finalist
2004 Face of FitSights Model Search Winner

References

External links

Official web site
Bodybuilding.com web site feature
Flex Magazine web site feature
Beverly International web site
NPC Website
IFBB Pro League Website

1974 births
Living people
Fitness and figure competitors
Sportspeople from Cincinnati
American sportswomen
21st-century American women